Good Hope Baptist Church is a historic Southern Baptist church located near Eastover, Richland County, South Carolina.  It was built in 1857, and is a two-story, rectangular frame building.  It has a front gable roof and a full height Greek Revival front portico.

It was added to the National Register of Historic Places in 1986.

References

Baptist churches in South Carolina
Churches on the National Register of Historic Places in South Carolina
Churches completed in 1857
Greek Revival church buildings in South Carolina
19th-century Baptist churches in the United States
Churches in Richland County, South Carolina
National Register of Historic Places in Richland County, South Carolina
Wooden churches in South Carolina
1857 establishments in South Carolina
Southern Baptist Convention churches